Emiko Ikeda (池田 英美 子) is a Japanese Paralympic alpine skier. She competed in the 1988 Paralympic Winter Games in Innsbruck. She won a bronze medal.

Career 
At the 1988 Paralympic Winter Games in Innsbruck, she won bronze in the LW10 giant slalom race. She finished third, with a time of 1:52.32, behind the Swiss athlete Françoise Jacquerod, gold medal in 1:14.65 and the American Marilyn Hamilton, silver in 1:39.48. She competed in the Women's Slalom LW10, but was disqualified.

References 

Paralympic bronze medalists for Japan
Year of birth missing (living people)
Living people